Dichromanthus michuacanus, the Michoacán lady orchid, is a terrestrial species of orchid. It is common across much of Mexico, the range extending south to Honduras and north into western Texas and southern Arizona.

References

External links
IOSPE orchid photos, Dichromanthus michuacanus (Lex.) Salazar & Soto Arenas 2002, Photo by © Carl Luer and The Swiss Orchid Foundation at the Jany Renz Herbaria Website

Spiranthinae
Orchids of North America
Flora of Mexico
Flora of Honduras
Flora of Arizona
Flora of Texas
Plants described in 1825